Larry Heater (born January 9, 1958) is a former American football running back. He played for the New York Giants in 1980 and from 1982 to 1983. Heater played college football at Arizona and was drafted by the Kansas City Chiefs in the sixth round of the 1980 NFL Draft.

References

1958 births
Living people
American football running backs
Arizona Wildcats football players
New York Giants players